The 2001–02 Georgian Cup (also known as the David Kipiani Cup) was the fifty-eighth season overall and twelfth since independence of the Georgian annual football tournament.

Round of 16 
The first legs were played on 31 October and the second legs were played on 14 and 21 November 2001.

|}

Quarterfinals 
The matches were played on 6 March (first legs) and 3 April 2002 (second legs).

|}

Semifinals 
The matches were played on 23 April (first legs) and 4 May 2002 (second legs).

|}

Final

See also 
 2001–02 Umaglesi Liga
 2001–02 Pirveli Liga

References

External links 
 The Rec.Sport.Soccer Statistics Foundation.

Georgian Cup seasons
Cup
Georgian Cup, 2001-02